TOPTICA Photonics is a manufacturer of lasers for quantum technologies, biophotonics and material inspection.

History 
The company was initially founded in February 1998 under the name TuiOptics GmbH for selling grating tuned diode lasers, but in 2001 it was renamed to TOPTICA Photonics AG.
TOPTICA won the contract to provide laser guide stars for the Very Large Telescope in 2010 and for the Extremely Large Telescope in 2017.
TOPTICA sponsored the joint OSA/DPG Herbert Walther Award and the American Physical Society's 2018 Norman F. Ramsey Prize.

Locations and corporate structure
TOPTICA Photonics AG is a privately held joint-stock company headquartered in Graefelfing near Munich in Germany with more than 400 employees and appr. 100 M€ turnover.
Its subsidiary  TOPTICA Photonics Inc. maintains the US facilities in New York State, whereas the Japanese subsidiary TOPTICA Photonics K.K. is headquartered in Tokyo and the Chinese subsidiaries are located in Beijing and Shanghai.
The subsidiary TOPTICA Projects GmbH develops laser guide stars.

References

Further reading 
 High-end Laser Systems for Scientific and Industry

1998 establishments in Germany
Laser companies
Technology companies established in 1998
Companies based in Bavaria
Electronics companies of Germany